William Elvet Collins  (16 October 1902 – 1977) was a Welsh professional footballer and Wales international. Collins was spotted playing non-league football for Rhymney Town by Cardiff City, signing for the Bluebirds in 1923. He spent four years at Ninian Park but struggled to establish himself in the first-team, making 12 league appearances for the club. He left the club in 1929 to join Clapton Orient.

He also gained one cap for Wales in his career, playing 1 match on 25 October 1930 against Scotland, in a match that was dubbed "Keenor and the unknowns" in reference to captain Fred Keenor and the non-league and fringe players who made up the rest of the squad after Football League clubs had refused to release their Welsh players for the tie due to a fixture clash.

See also
 List of Wales international footballers (alphabetical)

References

1902 births
1977 deaths
Welsh footballers
Cardiff City F.C. players
Leyton Orient F.C. players
Llanelli Town A.F.C. players
Newport County A.F.C. players
Wales international footballers
Date of death missing
Association football outside forwards